A list of films to be produced by the Turkish film industry in Turkey in 2012.

Highest-grossing films

Released films

Çanakkale 1915

See also
2012 in Turkey

References

2012
Films
Turkey
2012 in Turkish cinema